The Goroka Show is a well-known tribal gathering and cultural event in Papua New Guinea. It is a sing-sing held every year close to the country's Independence Day (16 September) in the town of Goroka, the capital of the Eastern Highlands Province. About 100 tribes arrive to show their music, dance and culture. The festival started in the mid-1950s as an  initiative of Australian Kiaps. In recent years it has become a major attraction for both national and international tourists and remains the largest cultural event in Papua New Guinea despite similar shows now being organised in Mount Hagen and other cities around the country.

See also
List of festivals in Papua New Guinea
List of folk festivals

External links 
 Photos from Goroka Show - 1957 and 1958
 Tribal Gathering: The Goroka Show 
 (1996) Pancorbo, Luis: "El show de Goroka" en "Fiestas del Mundo. Las Máscaras de la Luna". pp. 141–145. Ediciones del Serbal, Barcelona. 

Cultural festivals in Papua New Guinea
Dance festivals in Papua New Guinea
Music festivals in Papua New Guinea
Festivals in Papua New Guinea
Folk festivals in Papua New Guinea